Randrianasolo is a Malagasy surname.

People
 Joseph Ignace Randrianasolo (1947 – 2010), Roman Catholic bishop of Mahajanga, Madagascar
 Milson Randrianasolo (born 1957), Malagasy boxer
 Jean Dieu-Donné Randrianasolo (born 1989), Malagasy international footballer
 Yann Randrianasolo (born 1994), French athlete specialising in the long jump

Malagasy-language surnames
Surnames of Malagasy origin